September Morn is the thirteenth studio album by the American singer-songwriter Neil Diamond. Released in 1979, the album includes a disco version of the Motown song "Dancing in the Street" and a remake of "I'm a Believer".

The title track was an international chart hit, and became Diamond's 30th Top 40 hit in the U.S.  The song peaked at number 17 on the U.S. Billboard Hot 100, number 14 on the Cash Box Top 100, and number 7 on Record World.  In Canada, it peaked at number 15. The song was a much bigger hit on the Adult Contemporary charts, reaching number two in the U.S. and spending two weeks at number one in Canada.  "September Morn'" ranks as the 90th biggest U.S. charting single of 1980.  Cash Box called "September Morn" a "lushly orchestrated ballad [that] builds from a simple piano line to a full-blown chorus."  Record World praised Diamond' "awesome vocal talent."

Track listing

Personnel
 Neil Diamond – vocals, guitar
 Tom Hensley – piano, keyboards
 Bob Gaudio – piano
 Alan Lindgren – piano, synthesizers
 Reinie Press – bass guitar
 Doug Rhone, Richard Bennett – guitar
 Dennis St. John – drums
 King Errisson, Vince Charles – percussion
 Lou McCreary, Arthur Maebe, Dennis Smith, Graham Young, Henry Sigismonte, Jerry Hey, Lloyd Ulyate, Tommy Johnson, Vincent DeRosa, Warren Luning, Chuck Findley, Dick Hyde, Ernie Watts, Pete Christlieb, Steve Madaio – horns
 Sid Sharp – concertmaster
 Linda Press, Becky Lopez Lewis, Julia Tillman Waters, Maxine Willard Waters, Sherlie Matthews, Venetta Fields – background vocals

Certifications

References

Neil Diamond albums
1979 albums
Columbia Records albums
Albums produced by Bob Gaudio
Albums recorded at Sunset Sound Recorders